Caroline van den Brul  is a British television documentary producer and the author of Crackle and Fizz: Essential Communication and Pitching Skills for Scientists.

 Biography 
Van den Brul worked at the BBC for twenty-five years on factual programming including QED, Horizon and Tomorrow's World, and in 2003 she was appointed Creativity Leader for the corporation.

She has received two BAFTA TV Award nominations, and in 2006 she was awarded an MBE, in the Queen's birthday honours list, for services to broadcasting.

She currently runs her own professional training company called Creativity by Design.

FilmographyRoyal Institution Christmas Lectures, 1994 -1999, executive producer
 Hospital Watch, 1995, executive producer
 Morning Surgery, 1995, executive producerMeet the Ancestors (1998), executive producerSupernatural Science (1999), executive producerWhat the Romans Did for Us (2000), executive producerBlood of the Vikings (2001), executive producerWhat the Victorians Did for Us (2001), executive producerWhat the Tudors Did for Us (2002), executive producerOur Top Ten Treasures (2003), executive producer

Bibliography

 1994. 6th Guardian Lecture, Public Perceptions of Science: How scientists and others view the media reporting of science.'' Published by Nuffield College, Oxford,

External links 
 Official profile at Creativity by Design

Year of birth missing (living people)
Living people
BBC people
British television producers
British women television producers
Members of the Order of the British Empire